, is a controversial form of honorifics (keigo) in the Japanese language. Employers such as fast-food and convenience-store chains publish training manuals for employees, especially young part-timers who have little experience with honorifics. These manuals incorporate nonstandard formulas for servers and cashiers to use when addressing customers, most often by using alternate expressions which are longer and vaguer than the standard expression. Manual keigo are opposed by language purists on the grounds that their use frequently leads to non-grammatical and illogical constructions.

Other terms for the same phenomenon include "part-timer's (baito) keigo," "convenience-store keigo," and "family-restaurant keigo."

Forms

False choices: X no hō wa/ga
The use of X no hō wa originally refers to direction. In a contrasting sentence it is used to express preference to one thing instead of another. (Example: X yori Y no hō ga suki da. ("More than X, [I] like Y.") In baito keigo, X no hō wa/ga is used to refer to the way to a seat (which is technically correct usage because it refers to the seat's direction) and also to refer to the customer's choice between several options, e.g., gamushiroppu no hō ga ikaga desu ka? ("as for [the choice of] gum syrup, how about [it]?"). The latter usage is disputed because there is only one suggestion and no choice between different options being made: instead of X no hō wa/ga, the particle wa in X wa suffices for the meaning of "as for X."

States of matter: N ni narimasu
The use of N ni narimasu (N is a noun phrase) to mean desu is manual keigo. For example, in a restaurant, a server brings the customer's food and says ebi doria ni narimasu. Here, the meaning is simply ebi doria desu ("[this] is shrimp doria"). The construction ni narimasu as a substitute for desu is grammatically incorrect Japanese, appearing to the hearer similar to the English phrasing "This'll be the shrimp doria". In modern Japanese narimasu is a polite construction for the verb naru, meaning "to become," but nothing in X ni narimasu is transforming or becoming something else. The standard keigo expression is "ebi doria de gozaimasu." While the phrase "X ni natte imasu" (and its humble equivalent, "X to natte orimasu") does carry the meaning of "X desu", it implies a state of being rather than a physical object, as in, "Tōten wa zenmen kin'en to natte orimasu" ("This restaurant is completely smoke-free").

At the cash register

O-azukari shimasu
Cashiers frequently accept a sum of money from a customer and acknowledge receipt by saying, for example, ichi man en o-azukari shimasu; this phrasing is pervasive. The verb azukaru, literally "[I] temporarily take into custody", implies that the recipient will return the thing he or she received — it is used when accepting checked luggage, for instance — but cashiers do not return the total sum to customers. Ichi man en o itadakimasu ("[I] humbly accept 10,000 yen") is also used.

X kara
In addition to the above use of o-azukari shimasu, cashiers may also use kara ("from"), as in ichi man en kara oazukari shimasu. Prescriptivists argue that this is syntactically unacceptable, with the literal meaning "[I] temporarily take into custody from 10,000 yen", i.e., that the 10,000 yen itself has handed something over to the cashier.

Compound greetings: Irasshaimase konnichi wa
The double greeting is a form of manual keigo, as is the evening pattern irasshaimase konban wa. Some describe it as sounding like "welcome good afternoon" or "welcome good evening." Irasshaimase by itself is the traditionally prescribed greeting.

Non-traditional use of honorifics

Otsugi no okyaku-sama
"[The] honorable next honorable customer" is also nonstandard keigo. Purists maintain non-polite words can not be indiscriminately made polite by merely adding o or go (both prefixes meaning "honorable.") Although okyaku-sama (literally "Mr. Honorable Customer") is an accepted form of address of respect to a customer, adding o to tsugi ("next") is baito keigo.

A similar proscribed usage is "[name of food ordered] + no okyaku-sama" (example: ebi doria no okyaku-sama ("shrimp doria customer")), which is disputed on the grounds that since it does not unambiguously mean "the customer who ordered X" it can be interpreted as literally meaning "the customer who is X".

Gochūmon wa osoroi deshō ka
It is common for serving staff to use this phrasing. While gochūmon is acceptable with an honorific (as it refers to the order as belonging to the customer, who is the intended recipient of the honorific speech), prescriptivists argue that osoroi is incorrect because chūmon is the subject of the verb, and raising up the status of the order itself is not the intent: the literal interpretation would be "Are your [hon.] orders all honoring us with their presence?" The traditionally prescribed phrasing is, "Gochūmon wa soroimashita deshō ka" ("Are your [hon.] orders all assembled?", i.e. "Have you decided what to order?")

Complex and confused humble speech: Sasete itadakimasu

It is called  because suru ("to do") is often attached to nouns which can function as verbs with suru. For example, a store will place a sign outside stating . (Today, we receive the favor of you allowing our store to be closed.) Nevertheless,  is quickly replacing the simpler, traditional humble form itashimasu.

See also
Aizuchi

Sources
This article includes material from the article バイト敬語 (Baito Keigo) in the Japanese Wikipedia, retrieved October 20, 2007.
keigo sisin houkokuan (pdf), Bunka Shingikai Kokugo Bunka-kai, November 8, 2006 (retrieved October 20, 2007) (Updated: https://www.bunka.go.jp/seisaku/bunkashingikai/kokugo/hokoku/pdf/keigo_tosin.pdf (retrieved December 6, 2020).)

Further reading
"Sono baito keigo wa yamenasai" (Satoko Kobayashi, ed.) Nikkei Publishing 2004 
"The Use of "Baitokeigo" on Part-time Jobs by Young People : State of Mind of Speakers and Impression of Listeners" (Shin Horasawa and Eriko Oka) Bulletin of the Faculty of Regional Studies, Gifu University vol. 19 pp. 1–31 

Japanese honorifics